Kalitta Air is an American cargo airline headquartered at Willow Run Airport, Ypsilanti Township, Michigan. The company operates international scheduled and cargo charter services. Its call sign "Connie" is from its founder, Connie Kalitta.

History
In 1967, Conrad "Connie" Kalitta started the airline as Connie Kalitta Services, a business carrying car parts using a twin engine Cessna 310 that he piloted. The airline's name would later become American International Airways in 1984. At this point, the fleet consisted of Boeing 747, Lockheed L-1011, Douglas DC-8, Twin Beech, and Learjet aircraft, for air freight, air ambulance, and charter passenger operations.

During the late 1980s, the Kalitta brand name continued to appear on many of the company's cargo aircraft. In 1990 and 1991, AIA flew 600 missions in support of Operations Desert Shield and Desert Storm.

In 1997, AIA merged with Kitty Hawk Inc., and Conrad Kalitta resigned to start Kalitta Leasing for buying, selling, and leasing large aircraft. In April 2000, Kitty Hawk International (the former AIA) ceased operations. Kalitta decided to rescue it and the new airline, Kalitta Air, began operations in November 2000, using the operating certificate and assets of the former airline.

On April 21, 2017, Kalitta Air retired its final Boeing 747-200F from service. This was one of the relatively few then remaining in service. Twenty-six other Boeing 747 aircraft are still active in Kalitta's fleet.

Kalitta Maintenance operates a maintenance, repair, and overhaul facility at Oscoda–Wurtsmith Airport in Iosco County, Michigan.

In 2020, the United States Department of State employed Kalitta Air to evacuate U.S. nationals from Wuhan at the outbreak of the COVID-19 pandemic. Citing instructions from the State Department, company Pete Sanderlin declined to give the Detroit Free Press comment. The National Museum of American Diplomacy's collection of artifacts includes a commemorative patch honoring the "Wuhan Evac Team" featuring a Kalitta Air plane. It has the dates "01-27-20 to 02-08-20" and four N-numbers, N705CK, N706CK, N708CK, and N713CK.

American International Airways
The American International Airways name was also used by a charter and scheduled passenger airline which in 1981 was operating a hub located at the Philadelphia International Airport with nonstop service to Atlantic City, Boston, Chicago Midway, Cleveland, Detroit, Fort Lauderdale, Miami, Norfolk, Orlando, Pittsburgh, Tampa, and West Palm Beach flown with McDonnell Douglas DC-9-30 and MD-80 jets. The airline declared bankruptcy on July 19, 1984, and ceased operations in September,
 Kalitta, however, continued using the AIA name, as "Kalitta|American International Airways" for cargo-only flights until 1997.

Destinations

The airline provides domestic and international scheduled or on-demand cargo service and support for the requirements of the Department of Defense Air Mobility Command.

In January 2003, Kalitta Air announced the start of scheduled cargo flights from the United States to Europe. The freighters on this service operated from JFK (John F. Kennedy Airport, New York, USA) EWR (Newark Liberty International Airport, New Jersey, USA) and ORD (O’Hare, Chicago, USA) to AMS (Schiphol, Amsterdam, the Netherlands) and EMA (East Midlands Airport, England). The airline flies scheduled cargo operations between the U.S. and Hong Kong, U.S. and Germany (Leipzig/Halle Airport), U.S. and Korea (for Asiana), Los Angeles and Honolulu. Liège Airport was also used as a regular refueling stop on New York City – Middle East routes and in the Caribbean, Norman Manley International Airport.

As of February 2020, Kalitta Air serves the following destinations with cargo flights on a regular, scheduled basis:

Fleet

Current fleet
The Kalitta Air fleet consists of the following aircraft (as of February 2023):

Historical fleet

 Boeing 727-100F
 Boeing 727-200F
 Boeing 747-100
 Boeing 747-100F
 Boeing 747-200F
 Boeing 747-400
 Boeing 767-300BCF
 Boeing 767-300BDSF
 Douglas DC-8-50F
 Douglas DC-8-61F
 Douglas DC-8-62F
 Douglas DC-8-63F
 Douglas DC-9-10F
 Lockheed L-1011-200 TriStar
 Lockheed L-1011-200F TriStar

Incidents and accidents
On August 18, 1993, American International Airways Flight 808, a Douglas DC-8-61 (N814CK) with three crew members on board struck level terrain 1,400 feet west of the approach end of the runway while landing at Guantanamo Bay, Cuba. The aircraft approached from the south and was making a right turn for runway 10 with an increasing angle of bank in order to align with the runway. At 200–300 feet AGL the wings started to rock towards wings level and the nose pitched up. The right wing appeared to stall, the aircraft rolled to a 90-degree angle of bank and the nose pitched down. All three crew members survived with serious injuries, though the aircraft was completely destroyed by the impact and post-crash fire. Probable cause of the accident was attributed primarily to the impaired judgment, decision-making, and flying abilities of the captain and flight crew due to the effects of fatigue resulting from extended flight/duty hours. This accident was also featured in the 19th season of Mayday/Air Crash Investigation in the episode titled "Borderline Tactics".
On October 20, 2004, a Kalitta Air Boeing 747 (N709CK) with five crew members on board experienced mechanical difficulties with one of the four engines and diverted to land safely at Detroit Metropolitan Airport. No one was injured. It was discovered after landing that the number 1 engine had separated from the airplane as it climbed through 16,000 feet over Lake Michigan. The engine was later recovered for inspection.
During the 2006 Israel-Lebanon conflict (2nd Lebanon war) Kalitta Air made weapon supply flights from the United States to Israel, via Prestwick Airport in Scotland for refueling, without authority from the United Kingdom Civil Aviation Authority. Scotland's Crown Office considered, but eventually decided against, prosecuting Kalitta Air for two July 2006 flights carrying laser-guided bombs.
On May 25, 2008, a Boeing 747-209F/SCD (N704CK), operating as Flight 207 overran runway 20 at Brussels Airport. The aircraft broke in three and came to a complete stop in a field bordering the runway. There were four crew members and one passenger on board, and no injuries were reported. The aircraft destined for Bahrain International Airport was loaded with 76 tons of goods, half of which was diplomatic mail. Belgian investigators announced that the accident was caused by the decision to reject the take-off 12 knots after passing V1 speed following a bird strike. The Air Accident Investigation Unit (AAIU) of the Federal Public Service Mobility and Transport had investigated the accident.
 On July 7, 2008, a Boeing 747-209B (N714CK), operating for Centurion Air Cargo as Flight 164 crashed shortly after departing from El Dorado International Airport in Bogotá at 3:55 a.m. The aircraft was en route to Miami, Florida, with a shipment of flowers. After reporting a fire in the number 4 engine, the crew attempted the return to the airport. However, after engine number 1 failed as well, the aircraft could not maintain altitude and crashed near the village of Madrid, Colombia. The aircraft's empennage hit a ranch house, killing a 50-year-old man and his 13-year-old son who lived there. The flight deck separated from the remainder of the aircraft, and the crew of eight survived with light to serious injuries while the rest of the airframe was consumed by fire.
 On March 29, 2019, a Boeing 747 (N740CK) departing from Brussels Airport allegedly experienced a compression failure in one of the engines at two minutes into the flight. The aircraft was diverted over the North Sea to burn fuel and landed in Leipzig.
On September 30, 2021, a Boeing 747-400 (N741CK) operated as Flight K4330 from Leipzig (Germany) to East Midlands, EN (UK), landed on East Midlands' runway 27 when shortly after touchdown and after engaging spoilers and reverse thrust the #3 engine suffered a compressor stall and emitted a loud bang with flames.

Media appearances
 For the 1997 film Air Force One, the producers rented one of Kalitta's Boeing 747-212B aircraft N703CK and repainted it to replicate the iconic Air Force One livery.
 The TV program MythBusters featured one of Kalitta's Boeing 747s (tail number N700CK) in Episode 90: "Supersized Myths”, that originally aired on November 14, 2007. In this myth the build team revisited the myth of "Jet Taxi", the story of a taxi that got stuck behind a jet taking off resulting in the taxi flipping over due to the jet blast. This myth was found to be confirmed, in that a jet could flip a taxi as well as a school bus and a light aircraft. MythBusters featured another Kalitta Air 747 (tail number N709CK) in the episode "Storm Chasing Myths" that originally aired on October 13, 2010.
 Global News in Canada carried a story about a Kalitta Air 747 that carried Canadians who were stranded in quarantine on the Grand Princess cruise ship off the coast of California.  It landed at CFB Trenton in Ontario on March 10, 2020, where the passengers were quarantined for 14 days due to the COVID-19 outbreak.
 Kalitta's Boeing 747-400F (N716CK) can be seen in the documentary The Last Cruise evacuating U.S. citizens stranded aboard Diamond Princess cruise ship during COVID-19 outbreak.

N707CK, a former Kuwait Airways 747-269B was used for the filming of the movie “Executive Decision”. The aircraft was painted into the fictitious “Oceanic Airlines” paint scheme.

See also
 List of airlines of the United States
 Kalitta Charters

References

External links

 Official website

Airlines established in 2000
Airlines based in Michigan
Cargo airlines of the United States
Companies based in Washtenaw County, Michigan
American companies established in 2000
2000 establishments in Michigan